The 2017 F4 Danish Championship season was the first season of the F4 Danish Championship. The season began at Jyllandsringen in April and concluded at the same circuit in October.

Teams and drivers
All teams were Danish-registered.

Calendar and results
All rounds were held in Denmark.

Results

Footnotes

Championship standings

Points were awarded to the top 10 classified finishers in each race. No points were awarded for pole position or fastest lap.

Drivers' standings

Notes:
† – Drivers did not finish the race, but were classified as they completed over 75% of the race distance.

Teams' championship

References

External links
 

Danish F4 Championship
F4 Danish Championship
F4 Danish Championship seasons
Danish F4